The 2018–19 Lebanese Premier League season began on 21 September 2018 and concluded on 21 April 2019. 2018–19 was the 58th season of the Lebanese Premier League, the top Lebanese professional league for association football clubs in the country, established in 1934.

Ahed were the defending champions. Shabab Sahel and Chabab Ghazieh joined as the promoted clubs from the 2017–18 Lebanese Second Division. They replaced Shabab Arabi and Islah who were relegated to the 2018–19 Lebanese Second Division. Ahed won their third consecutive Lebanese Premier League title, and seventh overall, with two games to spare.

Summary

Issues
The 2018–19 season was one of the worst for Lebanese football since the Lebanese Civil War for various issues.

The first issue was the poor preparation and management of most clubs. Nejmeh had changed their head coach twice and bought five of ten summer signings only in the last week of the transfer window. Ansar changed their coach a week before the season began and signed two players in the last days of the transfer window. The league's smaller clubs had other problems. Tadamon Sour found themselves without a head coach or president at the start of the season. Tripoli also began the season without a head coach, as well as having not signed any new players. Nabi Chit SC changed their name to Bekaa SC in a failed attempt to attract more investors. Overall, only five of twelve teams kept their manager from the previous season, and most summer acquisitions were concluded in the final days of the signing window.

The second issue concerned the tensions between the Lebanese Football Association (LFA) and the clubs, with the referees' performances being the hot topic. Clubs like Ansar and Nejmeh protested to the Federation, threatening to leave the league if no improvements were to be made. These tensions culminated with the resignation of Semaan Douaihy, a member of the Executive Committee of the LFA. Salam Zgharta FC and Racing Beirut announcing their withdrawal from all LFA-managed competitions.

The final issue the league faced was the re-emergence of match-fixing. While the LFA proved its existence, it made no effort to punish the parties involved or to cancel the results of the implicated teams.

League summary
Al Ahed FC won their third consecutive title with a ten-point margin. The battle for second place went down to the wire, with Ansar claiming an AFC Cup spot from Nejmeh in the last matchday of the league. The relegation battle was also determined on the last matchday, with eight of the 12 teams all candidates for relegation. The Beirut Municipal Stadium and the Fouad Chehab Stadium returned to host Lebanese Premier League matches.

Teams

Stadiums and locations

League table

Season statistics

Top goalscorers

Top assists

Notes

References 

2018–19 Lebanese Premier League
Lebanese Premier League seasons
Lebanon
1